The Papuan Tip languages are a branch of the Western Oceanic languages consisting of 60 languages.

Contact
All Papuan Tip languages, except  Nimoa, Sudest, and the Kilivila languages (all spoken on islands off the coast of mainland Papua New Guinea), have subject–object–verb (SOV) word order due to influences from nearby Papuan languages (Lynch, Ross, & Crowley 2002:104). Universally, this is considered to be a typologically unusual change. Since these non-Austronesian influences can be reconstructed for Proto-Papuan Tip, they did not simply result from recent contact among individual daughter languages.

Languages
According to Lynch, Ross, & Crowley (2002), the structure of the family is as follows:
Nuclear Papuan Tip linkage
Suauic linkage: Buhutu, 'Auhelawa, Oya'oya, Unubahe, Saliba, Suau, Bwanabwana, Wagawaga
North Mainland – D'Entrecasteaux linkage
Anuki
Gumawana
Bwaidoga: Bwaidoka, Diodio (West Goodenough), Iamalele, Iduna, Koluwawa, Maiadomu
Dobu–Duau: Dobu, Molima, Bunama, Boselewa, Duau, Galeya, Mwatebu, Sewa Bay
Kakabai: Dawawa, Kakabai
Are–Taupota
Are: Are, Arifama-Miniafia, Doga, Gapapaiwa, Ghayavi, Kaninuwa, Ubir
Taupota: Gweda, Haigwai, Maiwala, Minaveha, Taupota, Tawala, Wa'ema, Wedau, Yakaikeke
Kilivila–Misima linkage
Kilivila family: Budibud, Kilivila, Muyuw
Misima language
Nimoa–Sudest family: Nimoa, Sudest
Central Papuan Tip family
Oumic: Magoric (Magori, Yoba, Bina), Ouma
Sinagoro–Keapara: Hula–Keapara, Sinaugoro
West Central Papuan Tip
Motu
Abadi
Nuclear West Central Papuan Tip: Toura, Kuni, Mekeo, Lala, Waima

Maisin is difficult to classify, but its Austronesian component likely belongs with Nuclear Papuan Tip. Yele has recently been tentatively classified as closest to Nimoa–Sudest, while others classify it as a Papuan language.

References

 
Western Oceanic languages
Languages of Papua New Guinea